Evelix or Evelick is a village near Dornoch in south east Sutherland, Scotland.  The River Evelix runs through it. Evelix is in the Scottish council area of Highland.

There is a petrol station with Tall Pines restaurant in Evelix, on A9. Households are scattered around and do not form a perceivable village.

References

Populated places in Sutherland